The Men's 800m T37 had its Final held on September 10 at 19:56.

Medalists

Results

References
Final

Athletics at the 2008 Summer Paralympics